Burmagomphus is a genus of dragonfly in the family Gomphidae. It contains the following species:

Burmagomphus arboreus 
Burmagomphus arthuri 
Burmagomphus arvalis 
Burmagomphus bashanensis 
Burmagomphus cauvericus 
Burmagomphus chaukulensis 
Burmagomphus collaris 
Burmagomphus divaricatus 
Burmagomphus gratiosus 
Burmagomphus hasimaricus 
Burmagomphus inscriptus 
Burmagomphus insolitus 
Burmagomphus insularis 
Burmagomphus intinctus 
Burmagomphus johnseni 
Burmagomphus laidlawi 
Burmagomphus minusculus 
Burmagomphus plagiatus 
Burmagomphus pyramidalis 
Burmagomphus sivalikensis 
Burmagomphus sowerbyi 
Burmagomphus vermicularis  
Burmagomphus v-flavum Burmagomphus williamsoni''

References

Gomphidae
Anisoptera genera
Taxonomy articles created by Polbot